Joseph Danlami Bagobiri (8 November 1957 – 27 February 2018) was a Nigerian Roman Catholic bishop.

Ordained to the priesthood in 1983, Bagobiri served as bishop of Kafanchan from 1995 until his death in 2018.

References

1957 births
2018 deaths
21st-century Roman Catholic bishops in Nigeria
20th-century Roman Catholic bishops in Nigeria
Roman Catholic bishops of Kafanchan